HD 10800, also known as HR 512 or Gliese 67.1, is a triple star located in the southern circumpolar constellation Octans. It has a combined apparent magnitude of 5.87, allowing it to be faintly seen with the naked eye. The system is relatively close at a distance of 88.1 light years but is drifting closer with a heliocentric radial velocity .

The system has a blended spectral classification of G1 V, indicating an ordinary G-type main-sequence star. The primary is a spectroscopic binary consisting of a G-type and K-type star circling around each other in 19 days. HD 10800B has a class of G2 V, the same spectral class as our own Sun. The AB pair take 1.7 years to orbit each other.

HD 10800A
The primary (Aa) has 109% the mass of the Sun and a radius 1.1 times that of the Sun. HD 10800A has a metallicity 81% that of the Sun, making it slightly metal deficient. The close companion (Ab) has a mass 69% that of the Sun.

HD 10800B
HD 10800B, the slightly distant companion, has the same mass of the Sun but is slightly cooler (37 K difference) and dimmer, with a luminosity 98% that of the Sun. The object is only marginally older than the Sun at an age of 4.8 billion years.

References

G-type main-sequence stars
K-type stars
Spectroscopic binaries
Triple stars
Octans
Octantis, 3
0067.1
PD-83 0027
10800
0512
007601